Ju Song-il (born 24 October 1973) is a North Korean former footballer. He represented North Korea on at least three occasions between 1998 and 2000, scoring twice.

Career statistics

International

International goals
Scores and results list North Korea's goal tally first, score column indicates score after each North Korea goal.

References

1973 births
Living people
North Korean footballers
North Korea international footballers
Association footballers not categorized by position
Footballers at the 1998 Asian Games
2000 AFC Asian Cup players
Asian Games competitors for North Korea